Jess Weixler (born )  is an American actress. She played Dawn O'Keefe in the comedy-horror film Teeth and Jordan in the comedy The Big Bad Swim.

Early life
Weixler graduated in 1999 from Atherton High School in Louisville, Kentucky, where she also attended the Walden Theatre Conservatory Program and was in The River City Players acting group and in the Chamber Singers choral group. Subsequently, Weixler attended Juilliard where she was a classmate of Jessica Chastain. She was a participant during the first year of Bruce Brubaker's InterArts performance project at Juilliard.

Career
In 2007 she was nominated for a Breakthrough Award at the Gotham Awards, and won the Special Jury Prize "for a juicy and jaw-dropping performance" at the Sundance Film Festival, both for her role in Teeth. She also appeared in the TV series Law & Order: Criminal Intent. In January 2009, she was named by New York magazine as the "New Indie Queen" of the year and one of the fourteen "New Yorkers you need to know".

In 2013, she joined the cast of CBS series The Good Wife, playing investigator Robyn Burdine. That same year she appeared in The Disappearance of Eleanor Rigby as the title character's sister. The part was written specifically for her.

Weixler next turned her hand to writing, penning the script for Apartment Troubles with her friend, and former roommate Jennifer Prediger. The two co-directed and co-starred in the movie. Apartment Troubles premiered at the 2014 Los Angeles Film Festival. It was picked up by Gravitas Ventures and given theatrical and VOD distribution in March 2015.

In June 2015, she joined the cast of Money, directed by Martin Rosete and produced by Atit Shah.

She played Audra Phillips in the sequel It Chapter Two.

Personal life
Weixler is married to Hamish Brocklebank, an English businessman and co-founder of Flooved, a school textbook distribution company. In 2019 their first daughter was born.

Filmography

Film

Television

Web

References

External links
 

Actresses from Louisville, Kentucky
American film actresses
American television actresses
Juilliard School alumni
Living people
1980s births
1981 births
21st-century American actresses
American film directors
American women film directors
Atherton High School alumni